Zachary Hayes (born April 24, 1999) is a Canadian professional ice hockey defenceman playing for the Utica Comets of the American Hockey League (AHL) as a prospect to the New Jersey Devils of the National Hockey League (NHL).

Early life 
Hayes was born on April 24, 1999, in Calgary, Alberta, the oldest of Trevor and Denise Hayes's four children. He played several sports as a child, including soccer, lacrosse, volleyball and field hockey, but was the most passionate about ice hockey. Hayes spent his minor ice hockey career with the Calgary Northstars of the Alberta Midget AAA Hockey League. He played in 27 games for the Northstars during the 2015–16 season, recording one goal and 10 points in the process.

Playing career

Junior 
The Prince Albert Raiders of the Western Hockey League (WHL) selected Hayes in the ninth round, 184th overall, of the WHL bantam draft. Hayes's parents wanted him to explore other options, and he played two games for the Canmore Eagles of the Alberta Junior Hockey League before signing a contract with the Raiders. After recording 29 points in his first 144 WHL games, Hayes was named an alternate captain for the Raiders' 2018–19 season. That season, Prince Albert won the Ed Chynoweth Cup for the first time in 34 years. They advanced to the Memorial Cup as WHL champions but were eliminated in four games by the Guelph Storm.

Hayes was named the captain of the Raiders for the 2019–20 season. He set career highs that season with seven goals and 16 assists in 60 games, as well as a team-leading +37 plus–minus. Hayes finished his junior ice hockey career with 15 goals and 79 points in 272 games.

Professional 
On April 6, 2020, the Vegas Golden Knights of the National Hockey League (NHL) signed Hayes to a one-year contract with their American Hockey League (AHL) affiliate, the Henderson Silver Knights. On March 30, 2021, the Golden Knights signed him to a three-year, entry-level contract that would take effect for the 2021–22 NHL season.

Hayes was promoted to Vegas on March 21, 2022, making his NHL debut for the Golden Knights' 3–0 shutout loss to the Minnesota Wild.

In the following 2022–23 season, Hayes was re-assigned to begin the campaign with the Silver Knights in the AHL. After registering 1 assist through 14 games, Hayes was traded by the Golden Knights to the Carolina Hurricanes in exchange for future considerations on November 30, 2022. He was assigned directly to Hurricanes AHL affiliate, the Chicago Wolves. In reporting to the Wolves, Hayes made 14 further appearances in collecting 3 points before he was traded for the second time within the season, dealt from the Hurricanes to the New Jersey Devils in exchange for Jack Dugan on March 10, 2023..

Career statistics

References

External links 
 

Living people
1999 births
Ice hockey people from Calgary
Canadian ice hockey defencemen
Canmore Eagles players
Chicago Wolves players
Henderson Silver Knights players
Prince Albert Raiders players
Undrafted National Hockey League players
Utica Comets players
Vegas Golden Knights players